Amravati Assembly constituency is one of the 288 constituencies of Maharashtra Vidhan Sabha and one of the eight which are located in the Amravati district.

It is a part of the Amravati (Lok Sabha constituency) along with five other Vidhan Sabha assembly constituencies, viz. Badnera, Teosa, Daryapur (SC), Melghat (ST) and Achalpur.

As per orders of Delimitation of Parliamentary and Assembly constituencies Order, 2008, No. 38 Amravati Assembly constituency is composed of the following: 
1. Amravati Tehsil (Part), Amravati (M.Corp.) – Ward No. 1 to 5, 19 to 31, 41 to 56 and 62 to 71 of the district. 

In 2019 Sulbha Sanjay Khodke defeated incumbent Sunil Deshmukh
To become MLA.
Indian National Congress is the most successful party in this constituency

Members of Legislative Assembly

Election results

Source:

See also
Amravati
Achalpur
Sunil Deshmukh
Amravati district
Badnera

Notes

Assembly constituencies of Maharashtra
Amravati